Anton Bruckner composed about fifty small piano works, the earliest in 1850, the last in 1868.

Works for piano for two hands 
Seven works are edited in Band XII/2 of the Bruckner's .
These works were mainly composed for his piano pupils during his stay in St. Florian (1845–1855) and in Linz (1855–1868).
 , WAB 243, a 194-bar long first "movement of a sonata" in G minor, found on pp. 157–164 of the : , Band XII/2, No. 7 (Addendum). The partially missing score for the left hand has been completed by Walburga Litschauer.
  (Quiet meditation on an autumn evening), WAB 123, a 58-bar long piece in F-sharp minor. A paraphrase of Mendelssohn's Lied ohne Worte opus 30, No. 6, which Bruckner composed on 10 October 1863 for Emma Thanner: , Band XII/2, No. 4
 Fantasie, WAB 118, a 119-bar long, two-part "fantasia" in G major composed on 10 September 1868 for Alexandrine Soika: , Band XII/2, No. 5
  (Remembrance), WAB 117, a 52-bar long piece in A-flat major composed in : , Band XII/2, No. 6

Piano works composed during Kitzler's tuition 
About fifty other piano works, which Bruckner composed in 1862 during Kitzler's tuition, are found in the Kitzler-Studienbuch: A not exhaustive list:

Works for piano for four hands 
 Drei kleine Stücke, WAB 124, three easy pieces (G major, G major and F major), composed in 1853, 1854 and 1855 for the children of Josef Marböck, to be played on their father's birthday: , Band XII/3, No. 1
It consists of six pieces: Pantalon (A major), Été (D major), Poule (A major), Trénis (F major), Pastourelle (D minor) and Finale (E major).

Selected discography 
There are about 10 recordings of Erinnerung, WAB 117. The other piano compositions are much less recorded.

Six recordings are dedicated to Bruckner's piano works:
 Wolfgang Brunner and Michael Schopper, Anton Bruckner – Piano works – CD: CPO 999 256–2, 1996 (all of the piano works issued in Band XII/2 and Band XII/3)
 Fumiko Shiraga, Anton Bruckner – Piano works – CD: Bis-CD-1297, 2001 (the works for two hands issued in Band XII/2)
 Ana-Marija Markovina and Rudolf Meister, Anton Bruckner (1824 - 1896), Piano Works – Hänssler Classic, HC17054, 2018 (all of the piano works issued in Band XII/2 and Band XII/3, as well as 13 piano works from the Kitzler Study Book)
 Francesco Pasqualotto, Bruckner Complete Piano Music – CD Brilliant Classics 95619, 2019 (the works for two hands issued in Band XII/2, as well as 21 piano works from the Kitzler Study Book)
 Todor Petrov, Bruckner - L'œuvre pour piano seul - CD Forgotten Records FR 1998/9, 2021 (the works for two hands issued in Band XII/2, as well as 39 piano works from the Kitzler Study Book)
 Christoph Eggner, Anton Bruckner - Klavierstücke aus dem Kitzler-Studienbuch  - CD Gramola 99282, 2023 (24 piano works from the Kitzler Study Book on a restored Bösendorfer fortepiano that has belonged to Bruckner.)

References

Sources 
  August Göllerich, Anton Bruckner. Ein Lebens- und Schaffens-Bild,  – posthumous edited by Max Auer by G. Bosse, Regensburg, 1932
 Anton Bruckner – Sämtliche Werke, Band XII/2: Works for solo piano (1850–1869), Musikwissenschaftlicher Verlag der Internationalen Bruckner-Gesellschaft, Walburga Litschauer (Editor), Vienna, 1989 (Available on IMSLP: Neue Gesamtausgabe: XII/2. Werke für Klavier zu zwei Händen)
 Anton Bruckner – Sämtliche Werke, Band XII/3: Piano works for four hands (1853–1855), Musikwissenschaftlicher Verlag der Internationalen Bruckner-Gesellschaft, Walburga Litschauer (Editor), Vienna, 1989
 Anton Bruckner – Sämtliche Werke, Band XXV: Das Kitzler Studienbuch (1861–1863), facsimile, Musikwissenschaftlicher Verlag der Internationalen Bruckner-Gesellschaft, Paul Hawkshaw and Erich Wolfgang Partsch (Editors), Vienna, 2015
 Uwe Harten, Anton Bruckner. Ein Handbuch. , Salzburg, 1996. .
 Cornelis van Zwol, Anton Bruckner 1824–1896 – Leven en werken, uitg. Thoth, Bussum, Netherlands, 2012. 
 Crawford Howie, Anton Bruckner – A documentary biography, online revised edition

External links 
 
 Scores of piano works on John Berky's website
 Werke für Klavier Critical discography by Hans Roelofs 
  Live performances of some Bruckner's piano works can be heard on YouTube:
 Anton Bruckner – Sämtliche Werke, Band XII/2 by Vadim Chaimovich
 The four Lancier Quadrille by Andrzej Jendryczko
 Steiermärker & Klavierstück Es-Dur by Markus Staab
 Stille Betrachtung an einem Herbstabend, Steiermärker & Klavierstück Es-Dur by Clark Bryan
 Stille Betrachtung an einem Herbstabend by "M1kek0" (2010)
 Erinnerung and Fantasie in G major by Gottfried Hemetsberger
 The Drei kleine Stücke WAB 124, by Raúl de la Mora & Héctor Ocampo (2011)
 

 
Lists of piano compositions by composer
Lists of compositions by composer